Nathalie Dechy and Mara Santangelo won the tournament in 2009, but Dechy retired from tennis later in the year and Santangelo chose to not participate this year.Iveta Benešová and Barbora Záhlavová-Strýcová won in the final 3–6, 6–4, [10–8] against Anna-Lena Grönefeld and Vania King.

Seeds

Draw

Draw

External links
Doubles Draw

Monterrey Open
Monterrey Open - Doubles